The Ali Muhsin al-Murisi Cup was an association football competition run by the Yemen Football Association (YFA). One edition was played in 2003.

Finals

External links 
 Ali Muhsin al-Murisi Cup results RSSSF

 

Defunct football cup competitions in Yemen
Ali